This is the progression of world record improvements of the 3000 metres M80 division of Masters athletics.  Records must be set in properly conducted, official competitions under the standing IAAF rules unless modified by World Masters Athletics.  

The M80 division consists of male athletes who have reached the age of 80 but have not yet reached the age of 85, so exactly from their 80th birthday to the day before their 85th birthday.
Key

References

Masters Athletics 3000 m list

Masters athletics world record progressions